Mario Bergara may refer to:

 Mario Bergara (footballer) (1937–2001), Uruguayan footballer
 Mario Bergara (politician) (born 1965), Uruguayan politician and economist